Bayram Safarov (born 1951) is an Azerbaijani politician who is serving as the mayor of Shusha following a four-day long battle, the Head of the Executive Power of city and the Chairman of the Azerbaijani Community of Nagorno-Karabakh.

Early life
Safarov was born in 1951 in Shusha, Azerbaijan. He has worked as the chairman of the Shusha Rayon Consumption Society and Deputy Head of Executive Power of Shusha. In recent years he has worked in executive positions at Azerbaijan Airlines.

Political career
On 27 February 2009 Safarov was appointed the Head of Executive Power of Shusha and subsequently elected the Chairman of Azerbaijani Community of Nagorno-Karabakh.

Safarov's stance on determination of Nagorno-Karabakh status is based on the requirement of having 65,000 Azerbaijani Community returned to their homes in Karabakh before any status is discussed.

References

1951 births
Mayors of places in Azerbaijan
Politicians from Shusha
Living people
Mayors of Shusha